Kerinci people (Jawi: كرينچي) is one of the ethnic group in Kerinci Regency, Sungai Penuh, Merangin Regency, West Sumatera, Malaysia, and other districts. It covers an area of 4,200 km² with a population of 300,000. Topographically Kerinci Regency owns hilly terrain in a row of the Bukit Barisan Range with the highest peak of Mount Kerinci.

References

External links

Ethnic groups in Indonesia
Ethnic groups in Malaysia